Changes in religious demography are often consequences, and often goals, of human mass migration to other territories. Often, the goals of a political migration is to establish a territory and governments biased towards and welcoming of members of the same sect.

Examples

Aliyah to Israel

After Austro-Hungarian journalist Theodor Herzl issued a call for Jewish settlement in the historic homeland of Israel (at the time known as Palestine), thousands and later millions would begin to migrate to the then-Ottoman-ruled territory and establish communal settlements known as kibbutzim. While the majority of early settlers who had migrated were secular socialists, a larger segment of later settlers from Europe after the turnover of the territory to British occupation would be more religiously observant and would be driven by increasingly violent and state-supported anti-Semitism. During and after World War II, Jewish migrants would flee to the territory en masse, despite British crackdowns on illegal immigration. Following independence in 1948, the state of Israel has had a policy of encouraging Jewish migration to the territory under the Law of Return.

Plymouth Colony

The Plymouth Colony was established in 1620 by a sect of the English Dissenters which had fled first to the Netherlands following persecution by the English monarchy before ultimately deciding to move to North America by boat. The migration, settlement and interaction with the Native peoples of Massachusetts would be celebrated in the present-day United States as Thanksgiving and a watershed moment for religious liberty in the continent.

Massachusetts Bay Colony

The Massachusetts Bay Colony was established eight years after the establishment of the Plymouth Colony by members of the Puritan movement. One leader of the movement, John Winthrop, sought to establish a "city upon a hill" as an example for other colonies to follow, and Puritanism was enforced, at the expense of other religious movements, as the favored religion of the colony for the majority of its history until its merger with Plymouth and other nearby settlements in 1691 into the Province of Massachusetts Bay.

Mormon migration to Utah

Members of the Church of Jesus Christ of Latter-day Saints were motivated to migrate from Nauvoo, Illinois to Utah due to both violent persecutions directed against the sect by Protestant citizens and government officials as well as a desire by Brigham Young to establish a Mormon majority territory that would be governed according to Mormon sensibilities and divine law. Tens of thousands of Mormons migrated to Utah and established settlements in the latter 19th century, eventually drawing the ire of the United States government for a time unyielding til the territory (also described colloquially by residents as "Deseret") was integrated as the Territory of Utah.

Pakistan-India

In 1947, upon the Partition of India, large populations moved from India to Pakistan and vice versa, depending on their religious beliefs. The partition was promulgated in the Indian Independence Act 1947 as a result of the dissolution of the British Indian Empire. The partition displaced up to 12.5 million people in the former British Indian Empire, with estimates of loss of life varying from several hundred thousand to a million. Muslim residents of the former British India migrated to Pakistan (including East Pakistan which is now Bangladesh), whilst Hindu and Sikh residents of Pakistan and Hindu residents of East Pakistan (now Bangladesh) moved in the opposite direction.

In modern India, estimates based on industry sectors mainly employing migrants suggest that there are around 100 million circular migrants in India. Caste, social networks and historical precedents play a powerful role in shaping patterns of migration. Migration for the poor is mainly circular, as despite moving temporarily to urban areas, they lack the social security which might keep them there more permanently. They are also keen to maintain a foothold in home areas during the agricultural season.

Research by the Overseas Development Institute identifies a rapid movement of labour from slower- to faster-growing parts of the economy. Migrants can often find themselves excluded by urban housing policies, and migrant support initiatives are needed to give workers improved access to market information, certification of identity, housing and education.

References

Politically motivated migrations
Religion and society